Feira da Mata is a municipality in the state of Bahia in the North-East region of Brazil. It was originally part of Carinhanha, but became an independent municipality in 1989.

Feira da Mata is located at the junction of BA-601 and BA-594. The Carinhanha River forms the southern border of the municipality, which is also the border between the states of Bahia and Minas Gerais.

Feira da Mata was originally home to the Kayapo people. Manuel Nunes Viana expelled the Kayapo population in the early 18th century and settled in the area.

See also
List of municipalities in Bahia

References

Municipalities in Bahia